Rettenschöss is a municipality in the Kufstein district in the Austrian state of Tyrol located 10.20 km northeast of Kufstein and 6 km northeast of Ebbs below the northern border to Bavaria, Germany.

References

External links
 Official website

Cities and towns in Kufstein District